Freaky Tales is an upcoming American drama film written and directed by Anna Boden and Ryan Fleck.

Premise
Depicts four interconnected stories taking place at real locations and during real historical events in 1987 Oakland, California.

Cast
 Pedro Pascal
 Ben Mendelsohn
 Jay Ellis
 Jack Champion
 Angus Cloud
 Dominique Thorne
 Keir Gilchrist
 Michelle Farrah Huang
 Normani
 Ji-Young Yoo
Sedrick Cabrera
D’Angelo Mixon
 Yong Kim
James Coker

Production
It was announced in August 2022 that Anna Boden and Ryan Fleck would be writing and directing the film. It is based on Fleck's memories of growing up in Oakland, California in the 1980s, and be a celebration of the city's culture. Oakland musician Too Short will serve as an executive producer. In November, Pedro Pascal, Ben Mendelsohn and Jay Ellis were among the cast announced for the film, which will also includes multiple notable figures from the Oakland area. Ji-Young Yoo would join the cast the following month.

Filming began on November 14, 2022 and wrapped on January 12, 2023 in Oakland, with production taking place on Telegraph Avenue.

References

External links
Freaky Tales at the Internet Movie Database

Upcoming films
American drama films
Films directed by Anna Boden
Films directed by Ryan Fleck
Films set in Oakland, California
Films set in the 1980s
Films shot in Oakland, California